In mathematics, the comparison test, sometimes called the direct comparison test to distinguish it from similar related tests (especially the limit comparison test), provides a way of deducing the convergence or divergence of an infinite series or an improper integral. In both cases, the test works by comparing the given series or integral to one whose convergence properties are known.

For series 

In calculus, the comparison test for series typically consists of a pair of statements about infinite series with non-negative (real-valued) terms:
Note that the series having larger terms is sometimes said to dominate (or eventually dominate) the series with smaller terms.

Alternatively, the test may be stated in terms of absolute convergence, in which case it also applies to series with complex terms:
Note that in this last statement, the series  could still be conditionally convergent; for real-valued series, this could happen if the an are not all nonnegative.

The second pair of statements are equivalent to the first in the case of real-valued series because  converges absolutely if and only if , a series with nonnegative terms, converges.

Proof
The proofs of all the statements given above are similar. Here is a proof of the third statement.

Let  and  be infinite series such that  converges absolutely (thus   converges), and without loss of generality assume that  for all positive integers n. Consider the partial sums

Since  converges absolutely,  for some real number T. For all n,

Given  then both  belong to the interval , whose length  decreases to zero as  goes to infinity.
This shows that  is a Cauchy sequence, and so must converge to a limit. Therefore,  is absolutely convergent.

For integrals

Ratio comparison test
Another test for convergence of real-valued series, similar to both the direct comparison test above and the ratio test, is called the ratio comparison test:

See also

Convergence tests
Convergence (mathematics)
Dominated convergence theorem
Integral test for convergence
Limit comparison test
Monotone convergence theorem

Notes

References
 
 
 
 
 
 

Convergence tests

fr:Série convergente#Principe général : règles de comparaison